Landsberg Castle may refer to:

 Landsberg Castle (Alsace), France
 Landsberg Castle (Palatinate), a ruined castle near Obermoschel, Germany
 Landsberg Castle, a ruined castle in Landsberg, Saxony-Anhalt, Germany

See also
 Lanšperk Castle, in Okres Ústí nad Orlicí, Czech Republic; see William II of Pernstein